George Bambery Purdue (4 May 1909 – 22 May 1981) was a New Zealand rugby union player. A lock and flanker, Purdue represented Southland at a provincial level, and was a member of the New Zealand national side, the All Blacks, in 1931 and 1932. He played seven matches for the All Blacks including four internationals. Of Ngāi Tahu descent, Purdue also played for New Zealand Māori in 1931.

Purdue died in Invercargill on 22 May 1981, and was buried at the city's Eastern Cemetery.

References

1909 births
1981 deaths
Rugby union players from Invercargill
New Zealand rugby union players
New Zealand international rugby union players
Southland rugby union players
Ngāi Tahu people
Māori All Blacks players
Rugby union locks
Rugby union flankers
Burials at Eastern Cemetery, Invercargill